White Sky is an album by British blues rock musician Peter Green, who was the founder of Fleetwood Mac and a member from 1967–70. Released in 1982, this was his fifth solo album, and the first for Creole Records after his split from PVK Records.

Track listing

LP and original CD
 All the tracks were written by Peter's brother, Mike Green, except as noted.
"Time for Me to Go" – 3:54
"Shining Star" – 3:10
"The Clown" – 6:05
"White Sky (Love That Evil Woman)" – 8:50
"It's Gonna Be Me" – 3:36
"Born on the Wild Side" – 3:02 
"Fallin' Apart" – 3:54
"Indian Lover" – 3:36
"Just Another Guy" – 6:06

Remastered 2005 CD release
"Time for Me to Go" – 3:54
"Shining Star" – 3:10
"The Clown" – 6:05
"White Sky (Love That Evil Woman)" – 8:50
"Funky Jam" (Peter Green) – 8:14
"It's Gonna Be Me" – 3:36
"Born on the Wild Side" – 3:02 
"Fallin' Apart" – 3:54
"Indian Lover" – 3:36
"Just Another Guy" – 6:06
"Touch My Spirit" – 3:47
"Big Boy Now" – 5:55
"Corners of My Mind" – 3:47
"Carry My Love" – 5:00
"Just Another Guy" (vocal version) – 5:53

Personnel

Musicians
 Peter Green – rhythm guitar, lead guitar, vocals
 Mike Green – vocals on track 4
 Ronnie Johnson – rhythm guitar, lead guitar (end of 3)
 Larry Steele – bass guitar
 Webster Johnson – keyboards
 Reg Isidore – drums
 Jeff Whittaker – percussion

Technical
 Peter Green & Jeff Robinson – producers
 Simon Heyworth – engineer, mixing
 Peter Cormack – executive producer
 Wally Marsh – sleeve illustration

Charts

References

Peter Green (musician) albums
1982 albums